My Man Is a Loser is a 2014 comedy film written and directed by comedian Mike Young. Filming began in New York City in June 2012. The film received a video on demand and limited theatrical release on July 25, 2014, by Lionsgate Films.

Synopsis
The film follows two married friends, Marty (Michael Rapaport) and Paul (Bryan Callen), who hire their single playboy friend Mike (John Stamos) to "help them get their mojo back" in order to save their marriages.  Their plan backfires, leaving their wives unimpressed with their new personalities.

Cast
John Stamos as Mike, a "raunchy playboy".  Stamos joined the film in June 2012.  According to producer Eric Bamberger, Stamos was cast as a 40-something "ultimate playboy".
Michael Rapaport as Marty and Bryan Callen as Paul, two friends trying to save their marriages.
Tika Sumpter as Clarissa, Mike's bartender

Promotion
Step One of Many Entertainment plans a heavily digitally-media-oriented promotion strategy for the film, focused on Twitter and Facebook.  The company states that it expects My Man Is a Loser to be "the heaviest digitally promoted Independent film to date".

References

External links
 

 

2014 films
American buddy comedy films
2010s buddy comedy films
Lionsgate films
2014 comedy films
2010s English-language films
2010s American films